Antonio Queipo (born 11 August 1931) is a Spanish equestrian. He competed at the 1960 Summer Olympics and the 1964 Summer Olympics.

References

1931 births
Living people
Spanish male equestrians
Olympic equestrians of Spain
Equestrians at the 1960 Summer Olympics
Equestrians at the 1964 Summer Olympics
Sportspeople from Madrid